Hands Across the Sea is a 1912 Australian silent film directed by Gaston Mervale starring Louise Lovely.

Plot
Jack Dudley, an English farmer, is married to Lilian, who is desired by the evil Robert Stilwood. While Jack and Lilian are honeymooning in Paris, Stilwood frames Dudley for murder and he is sentenced to imprisonment in a French penal colony in New Caledonia. He escapes and is rescued by a British man-o-war.

Production
The film was based on a popular English play by Henry Pettitt.

Release
An American film with the same title was released in Australia around the same time.

References

External links

1912 films
Australian drama films
Australian black-and-white films
Australian silent feature films
1912 drama films
Silent drama films